"Don't Let's Start" is a song by the alternative rock band They Might Be Giants, from their 1986 eponymous debut album. It was the first single released from the album, released as a maxi-single. The single peaked at #94  on the Australian ARIA singles chart in 1988.  It was re-released by Elektra in 1990 after the success of the band's third album, Flood.

Lyrical content
The lyrics of "Don't Let's Start" include a number of dark, pointed statements, such as "everybody dies frustrated and sad, and that is beautiful." John Linnell has repeatedly insisted that some of the song's lyrical twists, though pondered extensively by fans, were constructed to complement the melody and were not necessarily meaningful. Asked about the origin of the song's obscure lyrics, Linnell replied "where did it come from? I made it up."

Music video
A music video was produced for the song, and it found some success at that time on MTV. It was included on MTV's 1999 list of the "100 Greatest Music Videos Ever Made" at #89. The video was directed by Adam Bernstein and was filmed inside the New York State Pavilion in Flushing Meadows Park, the site of the 1964 New York World's Fair. The band is featured wearing tall hats which, according to John Flansburgh on Tumblr, consist of "a large piece of semi-rigid cardstock (cut in a little arc) covered with a light bolt of red velvet fabric from a fabric store." The video also features large cardboard cutouts of the face of William Allen White. His face also appears on the "Don't Let's Start" CD single, and has frequently been used in other contexts associated with They Might Be Giants.

Other versions
The song was covered by the band Common Rotation on their album The Big Fear.
Jimmy Eat World quotes the song in "A Praise Chorus" on their 2001 CD Bleed American (although the part is sung by guest vocalist Davey von Bohlen of the Promise Ring).

Track listing
 Maxi-single
 "Don't Let's Start" (single mix) – 2:35
 "We're The Replacements" – 1:55
 "When It Rains It Snows" – 1:36
 "The Famous Polka" – 1:32

 1990 maxi-single re-release
 "Don't Let's Start" (single mix) – 2:35
 "Your Racist Friend" (remix) – 3:50
 "She's an Angel" – 2:37
 "Absolutely Bill's Mood" – 2:38

 1990 single re-release
 "Don't Let's Start" (single mix) – 2:35  			
 "Letterbox" – 1:25  			
 "Sapphire Bullets of Pure Love" – 1:36

References

External links
"Don't Let's Start" (releases)  at This Might Be A Wiki
"Don't Let's Start" (song) at This Might Be A Wiki

1986 songs
1987 debut singles
Songs written by John Flansburgh
Songs written by John Linnell
They Might Be Giants songs